Jargö Lake or Qiagui Co (）is a plateau lake in Nagqu Prefecture, Tibet Autonomous Region, southwest of China, located between Nyima County and Xainza County. The lake, which is part of the Siling Lake drainage system, is primarily fed by a 1 km long river (from Lake Urru) and drains eastward into Siling Lake. It is 27.2 km long and 7.9 km wide and has an area of 88.5 square km.

Notes

Lakes of Tibet